Amalda tindalli is a species of sea snail, a marine gastropod mollusk in the family Ancillariidae.

The taxonomy status is uncertain.

Description

Distribution

References

tindalli
Gastropods described in 1898